El Eucaliptus is a caserío (hamlet) in the centre of Paysandú Department, in western Uruguay.

Geography

Population
In 2011 El Eucaliptus had a population of 197.
 
Source: Instituto Nacional de Estadística de Uruguay

References

External links
INE map of El Eucaliptus

Populated places in the Paysandú Department